Roy McCarter was a rugby league footballer who played in the 1930s and 1940s for Canterbury-Bankstown in the New South Wales Rugby League (NSWRL) competition.

Playing career
McCarter began his first grade career with Canterbury in 1937 debuting against St. George.  In 1938, McCarter played at halfback in the 1938 NSWRL grand final victory over Eastern Suburbs which was the club's first premiership.  

In 1940, McCarter played at halfback in the 1940 NSWRL grand final defeat against Eastern Suburbs.  In 1942, McCarter missed out on the 1942 NSWRL grand final victory over St George, picking up an injury against Balmain in the first finals game.  McCarter continued playing for another two seasons before retiring.  McCarter died on 1 November 1999.

References

Australian rugby league players
Canterbury-Bankstown Bulldogs players
City New South Wales rugby league team players
1999 deaths
Rugby league halfbacks
Rugby league players from New South Wales